Myb genes are part of a large gene family of transcription factors found in animals and plants. In humans, it includes Myb proto-oncogene like 1 and Myb-related protein B in addition to MYB proper. Members of the extended SANT/Myb family also include the SANT domain and other similar all-helical homeobox-like domains.

Function

Viral
The Myb gene family is named after the eponymous gene in Avian myeloblastosis virus. The viral Myb (v-Myb) recognizes the sequence 5'-YAACKG-3'. It causes myeloblastosis (myeloid leukemia) in chickens. Compared to the normal animal cellular Myb (c-myb), v-myb contains deletions in the C-terminal regulatory domain, leading to aberrant activation of other oncogenes.

Animals 
Myb proto-oncogene protein is a member of the MYB (myeloblastosis) family of transcription factors. The protein contains three domains, an N-terminal DNA-binding domain, a central transcriptional activation domain and a C-terminal domain involved in transcriptional repression. It may play a role in cell cycle regulation. Like the viral version, this gene is an oncogene, and rearrangements of the gene (often involving deletion in the C-terminal domain) causes cancer.

Plants 

MYB factors represent a family of proteins that include the conserved MYB DNA-binding domain. Plants contain a MYB-protein subfamily that is characterised by the R2R3-type MYB domain.

In maize, phlobaphenes are synthesized in the flavonoids synthetic pathway from polymerisation of flavan-4-ols which encodes an R2R3 myb-like transcriptional activator of the A1 gene encoding for the dihydroflavonol 4-reductase (reducing dihydroflavonols into flavan-4-ols) while another gene (Suppressor of Pericarp Pigmentation 1 or SPP1) acts as a suppressor. The maize P gene encodes a Myb homolog that recognizes the sequence CCWACC, in sharp contrast with the YAACGG bound by vertebrate Myb proteins.

In sorghum, the corresponding yellow seed 1 gene (y1) also encodes a R2R3 type of Myb domain protein that regulates the expression of chalcone synthase, chalcone isomerase and dihydroflavonol reductase genes required for the biosynthesis of 3-deoxyflavonoids.

Ruby is a MYB transcriptional activator of genes that produce anthocyanin in citrus fruits. In most citrus varieties Ruby is non-functional, but in blood oranges it upregulates anthocyanin production to produce the characteristic red color of the fruit.

See also 
 EZH1

References

Further reading

External links 
 
 Drosophila Myb oncogene-like - The Interactive Fly
 Arabidospsis thaliana MYB family at Database of Arabidopsis Transcription Factors (DATF)

Transcription factors
Human proteins